OVN (Open Virtual Network) is a system to support virtual network abstraction.  OVN complements the existing capabilities of Open vSwitch to add native support for virtual network abstractions, such as virtual L2 and L3 overlays and security groups.

Overview 
OVN is a network virtualization platform that separates the physical network topology from the logical one.  Users are able to connect virtual and physical interfaces with logical switches and routers, regardless of the underlying physical topology.  Users are also able to define security policies and load-balancing to these logical instances.  OVN uses Open vSwitch for its switching fabric and uses tunnels to provide the logical/physical separation.

Open source bindings for OVN are available for a number of platforms, such as OpenStack and Kubernetes.  OVN is the software-defined networking platform used in a number of Red Hat products, including Red Hat Virtualization, OpenStack, and OpenShift.

OVN is written in platform-independent C language, which provides easy portability to various environments.  The source code is licensed under the Apache License 2.0.

Features 
As of May 2018, features provided by OVN include the following:

 Logical switches
 Flexible L2/L3/L4 security policies
 Distributed logical IPv4 and IPv6 routers
 Native support for NAT, load-balancing, and DHCP
 L2 and L3 gateways

See also 
 Network virtualization
 Open vSwitch
 Software-defined networking (SDN)

References

Computing platforms